Progress M-23M, identified by NASA as Progress 55P, is a Progress spacecraft used by Roskosmos to resupply the International Space Station (ISS) during 2014. Progress M-23M was launched on a six-hours rendezvous profile towards the ISS. The 23rd Progress-M 11F615A60 spacecraft to be launched, it had the serial number 423 and was built by RKK Energia.

Launch
The spacecraft was launched on 9 April 2014 at 15:26:27 UTC from the Baikonur Cosmodrome in Kazakhstan.

Docking
Progress M-23M docked with the Pirs docking compartment on 9 April 2014 at 21:14 UTC, less than six hours after launch.

Cargo
The Progress spacecraft carries 2383 kg of cargo and supplies to the International Space Station.

Undocking and Reentry
Progress M-23M undocked from the ISS on 21 July 2014, and was deorbited on 31 July after participating in the Radar-Progress experiment.

References

Progress (spacecraft) missions
Spacecraft launched in 2014
Spacecraft which reentered in 2014
2014 in Russia
Spacecraft launched by Soyuz-U rockets
Supply vehicles for the International Space Station